The Arrowhead device is a miniature bronze arrowhead that may be worn on campaign, expedition, and service medals and ribbons to denote participation in an amphibious assault landing, combat parachute jump, helicopter assault landing, or combat glider landing by a service member of the United States Army, United States Air Force, or United States Space Force.

Criteria
A soldier, airman, or guardian must be assigned or attached as a member of an organized force carrying out an assigned tactical mission. A soldier, airman, or guardian must actually exit an aircraft or watercraft to receive assault credit. Individual assault credit is tied directly to the combat assault credit decision for the unit to which the soldier, airman, or guardian is attached or assigned at the time of the assault.  Should a unit be denied assault, no assault credit will accrue to the individual soldiers, airmen, or guardian of that unit. 

The arrowhead device must be authorized for wear in order to be worn on the suspension and service ribbons of the medal and is placed in position to the wearer's right of other devices on the ribbons including the "V" device,  service star, and -inch campaign star.  No more than one arrowhead may be worn on a medal and service ribbon. , the medals which are authorized the arrowhead device are as follows:

See also
Awards and decorations of the United States military
United States military award devices

References

Devices and accouterments of United States military awards